Centrotus is a genus of treehoppers belonging to the family Membracidae.

Species
 Centrotus chloroticus Fairmaire, 1851
 Centrotus cornutus (Linnaeus, 1758)

References
 Nickel, H., 2003 -  The Leafhoppers and Planthoppers of Germany (Hemiptera, Auchenorrhyncha): patterns and strategies in a highly diverse group of phytophagous insects - Pensoft Series Faunistica No. 28, Sofia-Moscow, Keltern, 1-460
 Nast, J. 1987 - The Auchenorrhyncha (Homoptera) of Europe -  Annales Zoologici Warszawa 40: 535-661

External links
 Fauna Europaea
 Biolib

Membracidae